Gaoping Town is a suburban town in Liuyang City, Hunan Province, People's Republic of China. It borders the towns of Yonghe and Gugang in the north, Zhonghe Town in the east, Chengtanjiang Town in the south, and the subdistricts of Hehua and Guankou in the west.

History
Gaoping was incorporated as a township in April 1950.

In October 2005, it was upgraded to a town.

Administrative division
The town is divided into 11 villages and one community, the following areas: 
 Gaoping Community
 Yangtan Village
 Chuancang Village
 Shiwan Village
 Xiangyang Village
 Zhimin Village
 Yandian Village
 Taiping Village
 Zhushuqiao Village
 Ma'an Village
 Shuangjiang Village
 Sanheshui Village

Geography
Daxi River and Xiaoxi River flow through the town. The town lies at the confluence of these two rivers.

Zhushuqiao Reservoir is the largest body of water and the largest reservoir in the town.

Mount Tianyanzhai is a mountain in the town.

Economy
The local economy is primarily based upon agriculture and local industry, such as vegetables, fruits and fireworks.

Education
 Gaoping Middle School

Expressway
 County Road X005

Attraction
Gufengdong Scenic Spot is a well-known tourist attraction.

Notable people
 Li Zhimin (1906–1987), a general in the People's Liberation Army.

References

Divisions of Liuyang
Liuyang